The Tinted Venus is a 1921 British silent fantasy film directed by Cecil Hepworth and starring Alma Taylor, George Dewhurst and Maud Cressall.

The Tinted Venus was based on the 1885 novella by F. Anstey (pseudonym of Thomas Anstey Guthrie), in which a statue of Venus becomes human and responds to social mores and repressed sexuality in Victorian England.  (The novella was also the basis for the 1941 musical fantasy, One Touch of Venus, by composer, Kurt Weill, with book by S. J. Perelman and Ogden Nash, and lyrics by Nash.  A 1948 film, One Touch of Venus, was based on Guthrie's book and the musical.)

Cast
 Alma Taylor as Matilda Collum  
 George Dewhurst as Leander Tweddle 
 Maud Cressall as Venus 
 Eileen Dennes as Bella Parkinson  
 Hugh Clifton as Jauncey  
 Gwynne Herbert as Mrs. Collum 
 Mary Brough as Landlady

References

Bibliography
 Palmer, Scott.  British Film Actors' Credits, 1895-1987. McFarland, 1988.

External links

1921 films
British fantasy films
British silent feature films
1920s fantasy films
Films directed by Cecil Hepworth
British black-and-white films
Hepworth Pictures films
1920s English-language films
1920s British films